An addictive behavior is a behavior, or a stimulus related to a behavior (e.g., sex or food), that is both rewarding and reinforcing, and is associated with the development of an addiction. Apart from the aforementioned addictive behaviors the most common one would be substance addiction (including alcohol, tobacco, drugs and cannabis). There is a medical model which perceives addictive behavior as a disease that is caused by uncontrollable and recessive drug use overtimes and the addict barely has control of it. The other view is from the moral standpoint which regards addictive behavior as an intentional choice was freely made by the addict. Addictions involving addictive behaviors are normally referred to as behavioral addictions.

Compulsion vs addiction
Compulsions and addictions are intertwined and reward is one major distinction between an addiction and a compulsion (as it is experienced in obsessive-compulsive disorder). An addiction is, by definition, a form of compulsion, and both addictions and compulsions involve operant reinforcement. In addition, dopamine is released in the brain's reward system and is a motive for behaviour (i.e. the compulsions in addiction development through positive reinforcement).

There are two main differences when it comes to compulsion versus addiction. Compulsion is the need and desire to do something or carry out a task regardless of the individual being aware of what they are doing is incorrect. Whereas addiction is often the following step after compulsion where an individual needs to do a task or take a substance to feel pleasure and satisfaction. The main differences are that compulsion does not necessarily include pleasure for the individual but addiction does.

In contrast, someone who experiences a compulsion as part of obsessive-compulsive disorder may not perceive anything rewarding from acting on the compulsion. Often, it is a way of dealing with the obsessive part of the disorder, resulting in a feeling of relief (i.e., compulsions may also arise through negative reinforcement).

Deep brain stimulation to the nucleus accumbens, a region in the brain involved heavily in addiction and reinforcement learning, has proven to be an effective treatment of obsessive compulsive disorder.

Correlation between different personality traits and addictive behaviors online 
The study indicates that there is a difference in personality traits for addictive behaviors that is associated with distinctive online tasks. Namely, higher neuroticism and less conscientiousness have a correlation with internet addiction overall; less conscientiousness and low openness to experience are connected with addiction to video games, neuroticism and extraversion were linked with social networking addiction.

Development of addictive behaviors in adolescents 
The expansion of addictive behaviors in adolescence contains different phases. In the first stage, one has the ability to control appetitive motivational tendencies, but they do not have the motivation to do so. Once enough drug or alcohol-related problems emerged, individuals tend to have more encouragement to adjust appetitive desires. In this circumstance, personal willingness and ability are hindered. there are a more powerful appetitive stimulation and a weaker ability to balance this response desire. The shortcoming between these aspects are the essence of addictive behaviors in adolescents.

Therapy for addictions 
Addictions might give an individual a sense of power, confidence, endorsement, or other feelings that they might not attain in their real life. Psychotherapy is a way to help people distinguish rough feelings and distress factors to adapt and grow. People that have trouble with addictive behaviors are unlikely to regulate those actions by themselves unless someone leads them to work on addressing the root of their addictive behaviors, such as trauma, stress, anxiety, and so on. There are a lot of types of therapy that can help people address the addictive behaviors which they want to alter. An individual who has an addictive behavior would most likely have the biggest advantage from consulting with a therapist that is recognized by the medical institution or organization to be the expert in the particular area of addiction or compulsion in terms of potential causes.

See also 
Addiction
ANNK1 and addictive behaviors
Addiction vulnerability
Behavioral addiction
Habituation
Substance dependence

References

External links 
 VideoJug video on "What is behavioral addiction?"

Behavior